"Electrica Salsa", also titled "Electrica Salsa (Baba Baba)", is a 1986 song by the group Off, featuring German DJ and singer Sven Väth and future Snap! producers Michael Münzing and Luca Anzilotti.

It was the first single from his album Organisation for Fun on which it appears as fourth track in its single version and as 14th track in the PWL remix. The song achieved success in many countries, including France, Austria and Germany, where it was a top three hit. The song was a hit particularly on the dance floors where it was much aired.

A new remixed version was available on OFF's next single, "Step by Step".

Track listings

Credits
 Produced by O.Büttner
 Executive producers : S.Väth/L.Anzilotti/M.Münzing 
 Music: M.Münzing
 Written: L.Anzilotti
 Mixed by M.Münzing/L.Anzilotti
 Recorded at Master Studios (W. Germany)
 "The mad house mix" mixed by Mixmaster Pete Hammond

Certifications and sales

Charts

Weekly charts

Year-end charts

References

1986 singles
Sven Väth songs